Saint-Pons may refer to:

Places in France
 Saint-Pons, Alpes-de-Haute-Provence, in the Alpes-de-Haute-Provence department
 Saint-Pons, Ardèche, in the Ardèche department
 Saint-Pons-de-Mauchiens, in the Hérault department
 Saint-Pons-de-Thomières, in the Hérault department
 Saint-Pons-la-Calm, in the Gard department

Places in Canada
 Saint-Pons, New Brunswick, a former local service district in New Brunswick

See also
 Saint Pontius (disambiguation), a number of Catholic saints